Captain William Frederick Strickland (1 February 1880 – 29 November 1954) was a Conservative Member of Parliament (MP) representing Coventry, from 1931 to 1945.

References

External links 
 

1880 births
1954 deaths
UK MPs 1931–1935
UK MPs 1935–1945
Conservative Party (UK) MPs for English constituencies
Members of the Parliament of the United Kingdom for Coventry